Sir Prescott Gardner Hewett, 1st Baronet, FRCS (3 July 1812 – 19 June 1891) was a British surgeon, and the son of a Yorkshire country gentleman.

Life
Hewett lived for some years in early life in Paris, and started on a career as an artist, but abandoned it for surgery. He entered Saint George's Hospital, London (where his half-brother, Dr Cornwallis Hewett, was a physician from 1825 to 1833), becoming demonstrator of anatomy and curator of the museum. He was the pupil and intimate friend of Sir Benjamin Collins Brodie, and helped the latter in much of his work.

Eventually he rose to be anatomical lecturer, assistant-surgeon and surgeon to the hospital. In 1873 he was elected President of the Clinical Society of London.  In 1876, he was president of the College of Surgeons, and in 1877, he was made serjeant-surgeon extraordinary to Queen Victoria, in 1884 serjeant-surgeon, and in 1883 he was created a baronet. 
In June 1874 he was elected a Fellow of the Royal Society

Hewett was a very good lecturer, but shrank from authorship; his lectures on Surgical Affections of the Head were, however, embodied in his treatise on the subject in Holmes's System of Surgery. As a surgeon, he was always extremely conservative, but hesitated at no operation, no matter how severe, when convinced of its expediency. He was a perfect operator, and one of the most trustworthy of counsellors.

Hewett died in 1891 and is buried in Brompton Cemetery, London.

Family
He married, on 13 September 1849, Sarah, eldest daughter of the Rev. Joseph Cowell of Todmorden, Lancashire, by whom he had one son, who survived him only a few weeks, and two daughters.

Hewett had three older half-brothers including, Dr. Cornwallis Hewett and Rev. John Short Hewett. Through his older brothers, he was uncle to Vice-Admiral Sir William Hewett  and Rev. John Hewett and great-uncle to Sir John Hewett  and Rear Admiral George Hayley Hewett .

References

Attribution

External links
 Biography in Plarr's Lives of the Fellows Online

1812 births
1891 deaths
British surgeons
British non-fiction writers
Burials at Brompton Cemetery
Baronets in the Baronetage of the United Kingdom
Fellows of the Royal College of Surgeons
Fellows of the Royal Society
British male writers
Male non-fiction writers